Vasiliki "Vaso" Nikouli (born January 1, 1984, in Larisa, Greece) is a female professional volleyball player from Greece, who has been a member of the Greece women's national volleyball team. At club level, she played for Greek powerhouse Olympiacos Piraeus from 2006 to 2011, winning 1 Greek Cup.

Sporting achievements

National cups
 2010/2011  Greek Cup, with Olympiacos Piraeus

References

External links
 profile at greekvolley.gr 
 profile at CEV at cev.lu

1984 births
Living people
Olympiacos Women's Volleyball players
Greek women's volleyball players
Sportspeople from Larissa
21st-century Greek women